Big Creek State Park is a 3550-acre state park located in Polk County, Iowa.

Geography 
Big Creek State Park is a  park built alongside the  manmade Big Creek Lake. Big Creek Lake was created as a result of a diversion dam to the Saylorville Lake Reservoir flood control project in the 1970s. The lake and its associated State Park is located 26 miles outside Des Moines, Iowa.

Ecology 
Known Fish Species in Big Creek Lake: 

 Lepomis macrochirus (Bluegill)
 Ictalurus punctatus (Channel catfish)
 Pomoxis (Crappie)
 Sander vitreus (Walleye)
 Micropterus salmoides (Largemouth bass) 
 Micropterus dolomieu(Smallmouth bass) 
 Esox masquinongy(Muskie)

References

State parks of Iowa
Protected areas of Polk County, Iowa